
Ivan Aralica (born 10 September 1930) is a Croatian novelist and essayist.

Born in Promina near Knin, and having finished pedagogical school and Philosophical Faculty at the University of Zadar, Aralica had worked since 1953 as a high school teacher in the backwater villages of the rural hinterland of northern and central Dalmatia. After a period of Communist infatuation (which resulted in a few weak novellas that can be labeled as socialist realism period pieces), Aralica was swept into the vortex of turbulent events known as the Croatian spring (1971). During this tumultuous era he allied with those who advocated greater Croatian autonomy and freedom for Croatian people in Communist Yugoslavia. The crackdown on the Croatian national movement and subsequent professional and social degradation resulted in Aralica’s return to his Christian and Catholic roots, abandonment of doctrinaire propagandist literature and formation of his own literary credo. Among world authors, he was influenced chiefly by realist fiction and early Modernism, the key authors being Ivo Andrić, Thomas Mann and Knut Hamsun.

From 1979 to 1989 Aralica published eight novels, which can be best described as modernist rewritings of historical fiction. The best among them (Psi u trgovištu/Dogs in a bazaar, 1979; Duše robova/Slaves’ souls, 1984; Graditelj svratišta/Builder of an inn, 1986; Asmodejev šal/Asmodey’s shawl, 1988) show similar traits: these are essentially novels of complex narrative techniques recreating dramatic events in Croatia and Bosnia and Herzegovina from 16th to 18th century and describing historical fatum of Croats caught in the “clash of civilizations”- a three centuries long warfare between Austria, the Ottoman Empire and Venice. Aralica successfully mastered many divergent elements in his fiction, so that his finest novels are both replete with contemplative wisdom sayings on human condition and rammed with action; also, his artistry is expressed in numerous naturalist passages integrated in the overarching Christian vision of life where natural and the supernatural fuse into one reality.

After the democratic changes in Croatia and the collapse of Yugoslavia, Aralica was elected to the Croatian Academy of Sciences and Arts; also, he re-entered politics, this time on the list of Croatian Democratic Union (Hrvatska demokratska zajednica/HDZ), a party headed by the independent Croatia’s first president Franjo Tudjman. Aralica held a few influential positions, the most important among them being vice-president of Croatian Parliament. During this period he wrote two books of political essays (one about the genesis of Serbian imperialism, the other on historical complexities of the conflict in Bosnia and Herzegovina), and two other novels.

The year 2000 was another turning point for Aralica: his party, HDZ, lost the elections and power, and writer was embroiled in a bitter polemic with new authorities (which were to hold power for the next four years). Aralica began writing satirical romans à clef (thinly disguised quasi-faction). The most famous one is Fukara (Good for nothing) from 2002, a satirical-political attack on multiculturalist ideology as promulgated by controversial American billionaire George Soros. The literary value of his works published during this period was often disputed, and they were seen by many left-wing literary critics (Perišić, Jergović, Tagirov, Alajbegović) as little more than tasteless political pamphlets. However, Aralica has also become one of the cultural and intellectual icons of nationalist conservatism in Croatia, advocating the return to the tradition symbolized by "ognjište" (hearth). Intellectuals on the Right defended his novels claiming that they were brilliant political satires.

Still vigorously writing in his eight decade, Aralica is considered one of the best Croatian novelists of the second half of the 20th century.

Works
 Konjanik (1971)
 Opsjene paklenih crteža (1977)
 Psi u trgovištu (1979)
 Put bez sna (1982)
 Duše robova (1984)
 Graditelj svratišta (1986)
 Asmodejev šal (1988)
 Zadah ocvalog imperija (1991)
 Sokak triju ruža (1992)
 Majka Marija (1992)
 Spletanje i raspletanje čvorova (1993)
 Što sam rekao o Bosni (1995)
 I tu je kraj (1999)
 Ambra (2000)
 Fukara (2002)
 Puž (2004)
 Duh zloduha (2020)

Notes

References

External links
 Ivan Aralica 
 

1930 births
Living people
People from Promina, Croatia
Croatian novelists
Male novelists
Croatian essayists
Croatian male writers
Male essayists
Members of the Croatian Academy of Sciences and Arts
Representatives in the modern Croatian Parliament
Vladimir Nazor Award winners
University of Zadar alumni
Croatian screenwriters